Yuri Hi (January 12, 1955 — August 13, 2006) was a Russian mountain climber, who ascended Dhaulagiri in 1995, Makalu in 1996, Lhotse in 1997 and Mount Everest in 2001.

He died in an avalanche on the Karakoram mountain K2, where he led a team of four from Kuzbass.

References

Russian mountain climbers
Summiters of Mount Everest
1955 births
2006 deaths
Deaths in avalanches
Mountaineering deaths on K2
Natural disaster deaths in Pakistan